McCauley Hot Springs, also known as McCauley Warm Springs is a thermal spring in the Santa Fe National Forest, near the Jemez Springs area of Northern New Mexico.

Description
McCauley Hot Springs is a large, shallow warm spring with a primitive rock-lined, gravel-bottomed soaking pool  in the Santa Fe National Forest. The spring water cascades into a number of smaller and deeper soaking pools in a clearing in the forest.

Downhill from the main soaking area is a three foot-deep rock and log-lined pool. Fifty more feet downhill and across a log and rock footbridge, are two additional warm soaking pools. From there, the water continues to flow downhill to another soaking pool that is between four and five feet deep. As the water cascades downhill the temperature of the spring water cools.

Water profile
The warm mineral water emerges from the ground at 99°F / 37°C, and cools to between 85-to-90° as it flows into the smaller pools.

Location
The hot spring is located in the Jemez Springs area, north of the Soda Dam and south of Spence hot spring. It is part of a system of hot springs on the edge of the Valles Caldera, a dormant volcanic crater.  The hike to the springs is 4 miles on a mildly strenuous, but well-maintained trail; the trailhead is located at the Battleship Rock campground.

See also
 List of hot springs in the United States
 List of hot springs in the world

References

External links
Additional photographs of McCauley Hot Springs

Hot springs of New Mexico
Santa Fe National Forest
Geothermal areas in the United States